Ceratitida is an order that contains almost all ammonoid cephalopod genera from the Triassic as well as ancestral forms from the Upper Permian, the exception being the phylloceratids which gave rise to the great diversity of post-Triassic ammonites.

Ceratitids overwhelmingly produced planospirally coiled discoidal shells that may be evolute with inner whorls exposed or involute with only the outer whorl showing. In a few later forms the shell became subglobular, in others, trochoidal or uncoiled. Sutures are typically ceratitic, with smooth saddles and serrate or digitized lobes. In a few the sutures are goniatitic while in others they are ammonitic.

Taxonomy 
 Ceratitida
Ceratitoidea
Choristoceratoidea 
Clydonitoidea 
Danubitoidea 
Dinaritoidea
Lobitoidea 
Meekoceratoidea 
Megaphyllitoidea 
Nathorstitoidea 
Noritoidea 
Otoceratoidea
Pinacoceratoidea
Ptychitoidea
Sageceratoidea
Tropitoidea
Xenodiscoidea

Only eight superfamilies are shown in the Treatise on Invertebrate Paleontology, Part L,(1957), the Otocerataceae, Noritaceae, Ceratitaceae, Arcestaceae, Clydonitaceae, Lobitaceae, Ptychitaceae, and Tropitaceae, in text sequence. The other 10 have been added since, derived from within the original eight.

References 

 Arkell et al., 1962, Mesozoic Ammonoidea. Treatise on Invertebrate Paleontology part L, Mollusca 4, Ammonoidea. R.C. Moore (ed)
 Paleobiology Database

 
Lopingian first appearances
Late Triassic extinctions
Mollusc orders